Happenstance is a 2000 French film directed by Laurent Firode and starring Audrey Tautou and Faudel. The film is also known as The Beating of the Butterfly's Wings, a literal translation of its original French title, Le battement d'ailes du papillon.  The title references the butterfly effect from chaos theory which is quoted at greater length by one of the characters in the film.

Synopsis

Audrey Tautou plays shop assistant Irène, who on the way to work takes a seat on the Paris metro opposite an older woman who tries to interview her for a marketing survey.  On hearing that Irène's birthdate is 11 March 1977, the woman reads her horoscope: today she'll meet her true love, but she must be patient.  After she leaves the metro, a young man sitting alongside (Faudel) tells the older woman he was born on the same day and asks her to read the rest of the horoscope.

The film then traces a range of characters of diverse ages, ethnicities and social status whose daily lives intersect with Irène and Faudel's in a variety of ways and come together at the end of the day. Seemingly trivial events—such as the throwing of stones or a shoe, the theft of a coffeemaker, a pigeon's consumption of a macaroon—determine the decisions and lives of the many characters.

Cast
 Audrey Tautou : Irène
 Faudel : Younès
 Éric Savin : Richard
 Frédéric Bouraly : Bobby
 Françoise Bertin : Luc's Grandmother
 Pierre Bellemare : Taxi Driver

Commentary
The film relies heavily on the notion of chance and happenstance interacting in unpredictable ways on people's lives.  It is a film whose action/plot appears heavily driven by the underlying chaos theory that gives the French film its title.

External links
 Happenstance at the Internet Movie Database
 Happenstance at Rotten Tomatoes

2000 films
2000 comedy-drama films
2000s French-language films
French nonlinear narrative films
French comedy-drama films
Films directed by Laurent Firode
2000s French films